Fan Chunling   is a Chinese  football player. She was part of the Chinese team at the 1999 FIFA Women's World Cup.

References

1972 births
Living people
Chinese women's footballers
1999 FIFA Women's World Cup players
China women's international footballers
Women's association football defenders